SM UC-63 was a German Type UC II minelaying submarine or U-boat in the German Imperial Navy during World War I. The U-boat was ordered on 12 January 1916, laid down on 3 April 1916, and was launched on 6 January 1917. She was commissioned into the German Imperial Navy on 30 January 1917 as SM UC-63. In nine patrols UC-63 was credited with sinking 36 ships, either by torpedo or by mines laid.

Design
A German Type UC II submarine, UC-63 had a displacement of  when at the surface and  while submerged. The submarine was powered by two six-cylinder four-stroke diesel engines each producing  (a total of ), two electric motors producing , and two propeller shafts.

UC-63 was fitted with six  mine tubes, eighteen UC 200 mines, three  torpedo tubes (one on the stern and two on the bow), seven torpedoes, and one  Uk L/30 deck gun. Her complement was twenty-six crew members.

Service career
UC-63 entered service on 30 January 1917, under the command of Oblt Karsten von Heydebreck. She was assigned to the Flanders U-boat Flotilla, based at Bruges in occupied Belgium.

UC-63 carried out nine war patrols, operating mainly in the North Sea against British fishing trawlers. She had considerable success, sinking seven and damaging two more in a single day in June 1917. In August 1917 she fought an action against two armed trawlers, HMS Nelson and HMS Boy Alfred. Both of these were sunk, and the crew of Ethel & Millie were picked up by the U-boat, after which they were not seen again. The suspicion then, and subsequently, is that they were disposed of by the U-boat commander, perhaps by being left to drown while the U-boat submerged. The German government had made it clear they regarded the crews of merchant ships who fought back against U-boat attacks as francs-tireurs, and thus liable to execution.

Before her loss in November 1917, UC-63 sank 36 ships, totalling 35,900 GRT, and damaged four more, in a nine month career.

Fate
On 1 November 1917, while operating off the Goodwin Sands, UC-63 was sighted by British submarine HMS E52. She was torpedoed and sunk with the loss of all but one of her 27 crew.

Summary of raiding history

References

Notes

Citations

Bibliography

 Ritchie, Carson: Q-Ships. (1985) 

German Type UC II submarines
U-boats commissioned in 1917
World War I submarines of Germany
Maritime incidents in 1917
U-boats sunk in 1917
U-boats sunk by British submarines
World War I shipwrecks in the English Channel
1917 ships
World War I minelayers of Germany
Ships built in Bremen (state)